The National Cancer Intelligence Network (NCIN), was set up in 2008 to drive improvements in care standards and clinical outcomes. NCIN is now part of Public Health England, following the Health and Social Care Act 2012.

About NCIN 

NCIN coordinates the collection, analysis and publication of comparative national information on diagnosis, treatment and outcomes for many types of cancers, in a way which is useful to patients, commissioners and service providers and other interested parties.

Sitting within Public Health England (PHE), the NCIN is a UK organisation that attempts to work closely with cancer services in England, Scotland, Wales and Northern Ireland but the majority of the reports are at an England level only.

It brings together information from national NHS cancer organisations, cancer registries, health service researchers and a range of other interested parties (including the Office for National Statistics; National Clinical Audit Support Programme; and NHS Digital (previously the Health and Social Care Information Centre).

To ensure that data and analysis produced by NCIN is used to improve clinical care, NCIN set up 12 site specific clinical reference groups (SSCRGs).These groups ensure that the interpretation of NCIN is relevant to clinicians and can be used by the clinical community to improve outcomes.

Members of the National Cancer Intelligence Network

Funding Organisations 
Department of Health
Cancer Research UK
Macmillan Cancer Support
Medical Research Council
National Cancer Research Network

Regional and Specialist Cancer Registries 
 National Cancer Registration Service (NCRS)
 National Registry of Childhood Tumours
 Northern Ireland Cancer Registry
 Scottish Cancer Registry
 Welsh Cancer Intelligence and Surveillance Unit

Statistical and Analytical Partners 
 Cancer Research UK Statistical Information Team
 London School of Hygiene and Tropical Medicine Cancer Research UK Cancer Survival Group
 National Clinical Analysis and Specialised Applications Team
 Health and Social Care  Information Centre
 Office for National Statistics
 UK and Ireland Association of Cancer Registry (UKIACR)

Other partners 
 National End of Life Care Intelligence Network
 Breakthrough Breast Cancer
 National Institute for Health and Care Research (NIHR) Research Capability Programme
 NHS Cancer Screening Programmes
 NHS Improvement
 Pharmaceutical Oncology Initiative

See also 
 Cancer in the United Kingdom

External links
 National Cancer Intelligence Network
 National Cancer Intelligence Network on the NHS website
 BBC article in response to an NCIN report on lung cancer

References

Cancer organisations based in the United Kingdom
Public Health England